Olszanka railway station is a station in Olszanka, Opole Voivodeship, Poland.

Connections 

288 Nysa - Brzeg

Train services
The station is served by the following service(s):

Regional services (PR) Wrocław Główny - Oława - Brzeg - Nysa
Regional service (PR) Wrocław - Oława - Brzeg - Nysa - Kędzierzyn-Koźle
Regional service (PR) Brzeg - Nysa
Regional service (PR) Brzeg - Nysa - Kędzierzyn-Koźle

References 

Brzeg County
Railway stations in Opole Voivodeship
Railway stations in Poland opened in 1847